Trent Bartlett (born 26 November 1976) is a former Australian rules footballer who played with the Brisbane Bears, Brisbane Lions and Western Bulldogs in the Australian Football League (AFL).

Bartlett captained Tasmania in the Teal Cup and was playing for Deloraine when he was picked up by the Brisbane Bears, with the 45th selection of the 1993 AFL Draft. He was used at centre half back at the Bears and spent some time as a key forward when he switched to the Lions in 1998, only after sitting out of football in 1997 with an ankle injury.

He was traded to the Western Bulldogs in 2000, for Michael Martin and played 21 games for the season. As a tall forward, he kicked five goals in a win over Carlton that year.

Bartlett played for Tasmanian Devils Football Club in the Victorian Football League between 2003 and 2006.

In 2016 Bartlett was appointed coach of the Clarence Football Club however resigned from the position in June 2016.

References

1976 births
Living people
Brisbane Bears players
Brisbane Lions players
Western Bulldogs players
Australian rules footballers from Tasmania
Tasmanian Football Hall of Fame inductees
Clarence Football Club coaches
Tasmanian Devils Football Club players